Federico Mazur (born 14 May 1993) is an Argentine professional footballer who plays as a defender for Barracas Central.

Career
Mazur, after a youth stint with All Boys, began his career with Albania's Shkumbini Peqin. He appeared eight times in the 2013–14 Albanian First Division season, including for his senior bow on 15 February 2014 as they won 3–4 against Kamza. Mazur left at the end of the campaign as they finished seventh, with the defender subsequently joining Espinho of Portugal's Campeonato Nacional on 31 July. Five league appearances followed, along with one in a Taça de Portugal loss to Sporting CP. Mazur returned to Argentina in 2015 with Torneo Federal B's Atlético Camioneros. In 2016, Ferro Carril Oeste signed Mazur; a team of his brother's.

After an overall of just seven appearances for Atlético Camioneros and Ferro Carril Oeste, Mazur moved to Primera B Metropolitana side Estudiantes. One goal, versus Excursionistas, in twenty-four matches subsequently occurred. For the 2017–18 campaign, Mazur played for fellow third tier team UAI Urquiza. Goals against Sacachispas, Almirante Brown, Atlanta, Estudiantes, his former club, and Defensores de Belgrano arrived as UAI Urquiza lost in the promotion play-off finals to the aforementioned Defensores de Belgrano. On 14 June 2018, Mazur joined Temperley in Primera B Nacional.

On 14 December 2019, Barracas Central announced the signing of Mazur.

Personal life
Mazur's brother, Rodrigo, is also a professional footballer.

Career statistics
.

References

External links

1993 births
Living people
Footballers from Buenos Aires
Argentine footballers
Association football defenders
Argentine expatriate footballers
Expatriate footballers in Albania
Expatriate footballers in Portugal
Argentine expatriate sportspeople in Albania
Argentine expatriate sportspeople in Portugal
Kategoria e Parë players
Campeonato de Portugal (league) players
Primera Nacional players
Primera B Metropolitana players
KS Shkumbini Peqin players
S.C. Espinho players
Ferro Carril Oeste footballers
Estudiantes de Buenos Aires footballers
UAI Urquiza players
Club Atlético Temperley footballers
Gimnasia y Esgrima de Mendoza footballers
Barracas Central players